The War of the Jülich Succession was a war of succession in the United Duchies of Jülich-Cleves-Berg. It lasted between 10 June 1609 and 24 October 1610, resumed in May 1614 and finally ended on 13 October 1614. The first round of the conflict pitted Catholic Archduke Leopold V against the combined forces of the Protestant Margraviate of Brandenburg and Palatinate-Neuburg, ending in the former's military defeat. The representatives of the Brandenburg and Neuburg later entered into a direct conflict after their religious conversion to Calvinism and Catholicism respectively. The conflict was further complicated by the involvement of Spain and the Netherlands making it part of the Eighty Years' War, as well as the European wars of religion. It was finally settled by the Treaty of Xanten, whose provisions favoured Spain.

Background

The rapid spread of the Lutheran and Calvinist doctrines after the Protestant Reformation was met by a period of Roman Catholic resurgence, known as the Counter-Reformation. Such interdenominational conflicts as the Cologne War and the Strasbourg Bishops' War prompted creation of the Catholic League and the Protestant Union, with the intention of safeguarding the interests of the Holy Roman Empire's Catholic and Protestant nobility, respectively. The aforementioned alliances entered their first conflict in 1609, when a succession crisis in the United Duchies of Jülich-Cleves-Berg sparked the War of the Jülich Succession. The territories in question covered an area of 14,000 km² and had both geopolitical importance from their proximity to the Spanish Road and a booming economy, which was fuelled by refugees fleeing the lands that were being ravaged by the Eighty Years' War. Johann Wilhelm, Duke of Jülich-Cleves-Berg, who was affected by a serious mental illness, died on 25 March 1609 and left no heirs to succeed him. Emperor Rudolf II had claims to the duchies stemming from intermarriage. However, he was unable to declare his intentions openly without compromising his perceived neutrality. A total of six other claimants appeared, with rulers of the Margraviate of Brandenburg and Duchy of Palatinate-Neuburg having the only credible claims through their marriage to Johann Wilhelm's aunts. On 2 April, a regency was established, including the duke's wife, Antoinette of Lorraine; the privy councilors; and an imperial commissioner. On 24 May, Rudolf II announced that the Aulic Council was to provide a definite verdict within four weeks.

Conflict
Brandenburg and Neuburg viewed the regency as a direct attempt at annexing the duchy. Their troops entered the duchy in defiance to the acting regency and the Emperor. In January 1610, Henry IV of France signed a draft military pact with the Protestant Union and dispatched 22,000 men under Marshal de La Chatre to north–eastern France. A comparable number of troops was dispatched by the Dutch towards Schenkenschanz in an apparent show of force towards Spain. Archduke Leopold V sought to raise his profile in the ongoing power struggle between the Emperor and Archduke Matthias by convincing the former to annul the Treaty of Dortmund and appoint him as the imperial to commissioner. Leopold triumphantly entered Jülich, but he soon found himself besieged by an army three times his size, as fighting spread to Aachen and Düren. The struggle between the Catholic royal family and the Protestant princes brought fears of a larger religious war. The Protestant Union mobilized 5,000 men, and Leopold recruited 1,000 cavalry and 3,000 infantry in the Prince-Bishopric of Strasbourg. His Habsburg relatives and the rest of the Catholic League refused to support Leopold openly and gathered troops only for their own protection. On 13 March 1610, Protestant Count Otto von Solms–Braunfels invaded Strasbourg with 2,000 troops. The Catholics simply retreated into walled towns such as Saverne and waitef until the ill–disciplined invaders ran out of money and retreated. A meeting was set in Prague on 1 May 1610 to broker a settlement. Rudolf's initial decision to enfeoff the entire duchy to Christian II, Elector of Saxony, was rejected by a number of moderate princes, which led to the postponement of negotiations until August.

A second Protestant invasion, this time consisting of 9,800 troops and artillery, succeeded in seizing Dachstein, Mutzig and Molsheim, but it too was brought to halt after the local population had refused to supply it food. In the meantime, Leopold had fled Jülich and left 1,500 troops inside. Their fate was sealed as the Kingdom of France and the Dutch Republic finally intervened in support of the Protestants and aimed to antagonise Spain by putting further pressure on the Spanish Road. The Dutch intercepted a relief party heading from the Prince-Bishopric of Liège and bolstered the besiegers into a combined total of 25,200 troops. On 1 September, the garrison surrendered in return for free passage into upper Alsace. On 24 October, the Protestant Union and the Catholic League agreed to withdraw their forces and to disband them until the end of the year. The war severely depleted the coffers of all the involved parties, leading to increased taxes, which in  turn triggered the 1612 Tirol Peasant Revolt. Possessors Wolfgang Wilhelm von Pfalz-Neuburg and Joachim Ernst, Margrave of Brandenburg-Ansbach took over the duchy by military might without having been able to secure official recognition.
  
In 1611, Protestantism spread to the villages of Stolberg and Weiden, in the vicinity of Aachen. In response, the city council of Aachen imposed a fine on those inhabitants who attended Protestant services. Five citizens were detained for ignoring the town's decree banished and were as they refused to pay the fine. That caused a riot against the council on 5 July. The Catholic councillors were expelled, and many Catholic buildings were sacked. The rebels assaulted the church and the College of the Jesuits, smashed the altars and images and held a mock mass by being dressed in confiscated priestly garments. A new Protestant council was established and appealed for support to the Possessors. In 1612, Rudolf ordered the Possessors to reinstate Catholicism in the city of Aachen under the menace of a ban. The city's Protestants, however, ignored the command and seriously wounded an Imperial commissary sent to implement the Emperor's edict.

Upon Rudolf's death, Emperor Matthias confirmed Saxony's rights to the fief, which rekindled the dispute. Furthermore, the conversions of Ernst and Wolfgang Wilhelm to Calvinism and Catholicism respectively completely restructured their past alliances. Brandenburg and Neuburg officials ceased communicating with each other by early 1614. In May 1614, 300 Dutch troops ejected the Neuburg garrison from Jülich, in an attempt by the Dutch statesman Johan van Oldenbarnevelt to prevent a Brandenburg plot against the former. Wolfgang Wilhelm interpreted it as a declaration of war, raised 900 troops and took Düsseldorf. The new Brandenburg possessor, George William, was indeed plotting a coup, but his financial dependence on the Dutch prevented him from fulfilling his plans. Another misunderstanding took place when Spain and Albert VII, Archduke of Austria, interpreted the Dutch military buildup as a violation of the Twelve Years' Truce and mobilised 13,300 infantry and 1,300 cavalry under Spanish General Ambrogio Spinola. 

On 20 February 1614, Emperor Matthias ordered the restoration of the Catholic rule in Aachen. Fearing an attack, the city council requested the aid of the Elector of Brandenburg, who sent several hundred soldiers under General Georg von Pulitz to reinforce the local militia. On 24 August, Spinola besieged Aachen under the premise of imposing a two-year-old imperial edict issued by Rudolf. After several days of negotiations, the garrison was allowed to leave, together with Protestant clerics and noncitizens. The old city council was reinstated, and the participants of the 1611 riots were punished. From Aachen, Spinola pressed on towards Düren, Neuss, Wesel and Mülheim, which he captured with Wolfgang Wilhelm's help. The Dutch occupied the duchy of Mark and the rest of Cleves and also reinforced Jülich.

Aftermath
On 13 October 1614, Spinola and Maurice of Nassau initiated peace negotiations under French and English mediation. The conflict ended with the signing of the Treaty of Xanten on 12 November. The territories of Jülich-Berg and Ravenstein went to Wolfgang Wilhelm of Neuburg, and Cleves-Mark and Ravensberg went to George William. Spain gained a total of 62 towns including three crossings across the Rhine River (Wesel, Orsoy and Rheinberg), which significantly enhancing its position in North–western Europe. The Dutch retained their garrisons at Jülich and Pfaffenmütze but were now outflanked or even isolated, which put them in an unfavourable position when the Twelve Years' Truce expired in April 1621.

See also

 War of the Mantuan Succession
 Siege of Jülich (1621–22)

Notes

References

 
 
 
 
 
 

Julich Succession
Wars involving Spain
Wars involving France
Wars involving the Dutch Republic
Duchy of Jülich
Julich
Conflicts in 1609
Conflicts in 1610
Conflicts in 1614
1609 in Europe
1610 in Europe
1614 in Europe
Eighty Years' War
County of Mark